Elizabeth Moon (born March 7, 1945) is an American science fiction and fantasy writer. Her other writing includes newspaper columns and opinion pieces.  Her novel The Speed of Dark won the 2003 Nebula Award.  Prior to her writing career, she served in the United States Marine Corps.

Early life
Moon was born Susan Elizabeth Norris and grew up in McAllen, Texas. She started writing when she was a child and first tried a book, which was about her dog, at age six. She was inspired to write creatively, and says that she began writing science fiction in her teens, considering it a sideline.

She earned a Bachelor's degree in History from Rice University in Houston, Texas in 1968 and later earned a second B.A. in Biology. In 1968, she joined the United States Marine Corps as a computer specialist, attaining the rank of 1st Lieutenant while on active duty. She married Richard Sloan Moon in 1969 and they have a son, Michael, born in 1983.

Writing career
Moon began writing professionally in her mid-thirties and had a newspaper column in a county weekly newspaper. In 1986, she published her first science fiction in the monthly magazine Analog and the anthology series Sword and Sorceress. Her stories appeared regularly in Analog the next few years. Her first novel The Sheepfarmer's Daughter (1988) won the Compton Crook Award and inaugurated the Paksenarrion series.

Most of her work has military science fiction themes, although biology, politics, and personal relationships also feature strongly. The Serrano Legacy is a space opera. Her Nebula-winning novel The Speed of Dark (2003) is a near-future story told from the viewpoint of an autistic data analyst, inspired by her own autistic son Michael.

Other interests
Elizabeth Moon has many interests besides writing. She has a musical background, having played the accordion during her university days and sung in choirs. She is an accomplished fencer, and captain of the SFWA Musketeers, a group of published speculative fiction authors who also fence.

Moon is also an experienced paramedic and has served in various capacities in local government.

Awards and nominations
1989: Compton Crook Award winner for Sheepfarmer's Daughter
1997: Hugo Award for Best Novel (nomination) for Remnant Population
2003: Nebula Award for Best Novel winner for The Speed of Dark
2003: Arthur C. Clarke Award (nomination) for The Speed of Dark
2007: Robert A. Heinlein Award for "outstanding published works in hard science fiction or technical writings that inspire the human exploration of space"

Works

Paksenarrion

The Deed of Paksenarrion novels
 Sheepfarmer's Daughter (June 1988)
 Divided Allegiance (October 1988)
 Oath of Gold (January 1989)
 “Those Who Walk in Darkness” (March 1990)—short story set during Oath of Gold, included in the collections Lunar Activity and Phases
 The Deed of Paksenarrion (February 1992)—paperback omnibus
 The Deed of Paksenarrion (October 2003)—hardcover omnibus
 The Deed of Paksenarrion (January 2010)—paperback omnibus

The Legacy of Gird novels
 Surrender None (June 1990)—prequel to The Deed of Paksenarrion
 Liar's Oath (May 1992)—sequel to Surrender None
 The Legacy of Gird (September 1996)—paperback omnibus
 available as A Legacy of Honour (paperback omnibus) (November 2010)

Paladin's Legacy or Legend of Paksenarrion novels
 Oath of Fealty (March 2010)—sequel to Oath of Gold
 Kings of the North (March 2011)
 Echoes of Betrayal (February 2012)
 Limits of Power (June 2013)
 Crown of Renewal (May 2014)

Familias Regnant universe
 Heris Serrano trilogy
 Hunting Party (July 1993)
 Sporting Chance (September 1994)
 Winning Colors (August 1995)
Heris Serrano (July 2002)—Baen omnibus edition of Hunting Party, Sporting Chance and Winning Colors
The Serrano Legacy: Omnibus One (December 2006)—Orbit GB omnibus
 Esmay Suiza continuation
 Once a Hero (Hardcover , March 1997)
 Rules of Engagement (Hardcover , December 1998)
The Serrano Connection: Omnibus Two (September 2007)—Orbit GB omnibus
The Serrano Connection (October 2008)—Baen omnibus edition
 Suiza and Serrano
 Change of Command (Hardcover , December 1999)
 Against the Odds (Hardcover , December 2000)
The Serrano Succession: Omnibus Three (February 2008)—Orbit GB omnibus

Vatta's War

 Trading in Danger (Hardcover , October 2003)
 Marque and Reprisal (Hardcover , October 2004)—Moving Target in the UK, New Zealand and Australia
 Engaging the Enemy (Hardcover , March 2006)
 Command Decision (Hardcover , February 2007)
 Victory Conditions  (Hardcover , February 2008)

Vatta's Peace
 Cold Welcome (Hardcover , April 2017)
 Into the Fire (Hardcover , February 2018)

Planet Pirates
 The Planet Pirates trilogy is based on two books by Anne McCaffrey, Dinosaur Planet and Dinosaur Planet Survivors (1978 and 1984, jointly reissued as The Ireta Adventure in 1985 and The Mystery of Ireta in 2004), which also form the core of The Death of Sleep. ISFDB catalogs all five novels as the Ireta series.
 Sassinak (Baen Books, March 1990), Anne McCaffrey and Moon
 The Death of Sleep (Baen, June 1990), McCaffrey and Jody Lynn Nye
 Generation Warriors (Baen, February 1991), McCaffrey and Moon
Omnibus edition: The Planet Pirates (Baen, October 1993), McCaffrey, Moon, and Nye

Other novels
 Remnant Population (Hardcover , May 1996)
 Speed of Dark (Orbit UK October 2002)—as The Speed of Dark (Ballantine 2003) in the USA

Short stories
 "And Ladies of the Club" (1995; collected in Esther Friesner's anthology Chicks in Chainmail)
 "Tradition" (1998; collected in Harry Turtledove's anthology Alternate Generals)

Collections
 Lunar Activity (March 1990)—Ten short stories
 Phases (December 1997)—Eight stories from Lunar Activity, and others previously uncollected.
 Both include "Those Who Walk in Darkness"—a Paksenarrion short story
 Moon Flights (hardcover , paperback , August 2008)—Fifteen stories, including an original "Vatta's War" story, with an introduction by Anne McCaffrey
 The limited edition hardcover (September 2007) contains an additional rare bonus story entitled "Fencing In".
 Deeds of Honor: Paksenarrion World Chronicles (June 2015)—Eight stories set in the world of Paksenarrion.

See also
 Women in speculative fiction

References

External links

 
 Paksworld blog (official)
 MoonScape—personal blog at LiveJournal
 
 Elizabeth Moon’s list of her own short fiction
 Elizabeth Moon. The Locus Index to SF Awards: Index of Literary Nominees.
 Free copies of Sheepfarmer's Daughter from the Baen Free Library
 Elizabeth Moon novels produced at Graphic Audio (GraphicAudio.net)
 Moon Flights at Night Shade Books

Interviews 
 Christopher Dow, Elizabeth Moon's Path to the Stars, Rice University's alumni magazine, The Sallyport. Retrieved 2007-09-15. 
 Lotesse, The OF Blog, Interview with Elizabeth Moon (August 18, 2006). Retrieved 2012-02-03.
 Kurt Weller, Interview (March 30, 2007), The Plaza of the Mind, Blogspot. Retrieved 2007-09-15.
 Lou Antonelli, Texas author un-invited as convention Guest of Honor over remarks on Islam (October 23, 2010), NewsOK.

1945 births
20th-century American novelists
20th-century American women writers
21st-century American novelists
21st-century American women writers
American Episcopalians
American fantasy writers
American science fiction writers
American women novelists
Living people
Military science fiction writers
Nebula Award winners
People from McAllen, Texas
Rice University alumni
United States Marine Corps officers
Female United States Marine Corps personnel
Women science fiction and fantasy writers
Military personnel from Texas